This article lists the winners and nominees for the Black Reel Award for Outstanding Actor in a Motion Picture. The award recognize an actor who has delivered an outstanding performance in a leading role within the given eligible period.

Denzel Washington received the very first award for The Hurricane at the 1st Annual Black Reel Award. Since its inception, the award has been given out to 17 actors. Denzel Washington holds the record for most wins and nominations in this category with 5 wins and 15 nominations, respectively. Other multiple winners include Chiwetel Ejiofor & Chadwick Boseman. Washington also became the first person to earn multiple nominations in the same year for The Book of Eli & Unstoppable at the 11th Annual Black Reel Awards. Samuel L. Jackson & Don Cheadle are tied as the most nominated actors in this category without a win.

At the 21st Annual Black Reel Awards, Chadwick Boseman became the first posthumous acting winner in Black Reel Awards History for his performance in Ma Rainey's Black Bottom. 

At age 18, Dev Patel became the youngest actor to win this award for Slumdog Millionaire and at age 72, Morgan Freeman became the oldest winner in this category for Invictus.

Winners and nominees
Winners are listed first and highlighted in bold.

2000s

2010s

2020s

Multiple nominations and wins

Multiple wins
 5 Wins
 Denzel Washington

 2 Wins
 Chadwick Boseman
 Chiwetel Ejiofor

Multiple nominations

 15 Nominations
 Denzel Washington

 5 Nominations
 Don Cheadle
 Jamie Foxx
 Samuel L. Jackson
 Will Smith

 4 Nominations
 Chadwick Boseman
 Chiwetel Ejiofor

 3 Nominations
 Derek Luke
 Michael B. Jordan
 Daniel Kaluuya
 Nate Parker
 LaKeith Stanfield

 2 Nominations
 John Boyega
 Chris Rock
 Cuba Gooding Jr.
 Kelvin Harrison Jr.
 Jonathan Majors
 Eddie Murphy
 Forest Whitaker
 Ice Cube
 Idris Elba
 Morgan Freeman

Age superlatives

References

Black Reel Awards